Naing Zayar Htun (born 28 December 1985) is a footballer from Burma, and a goalkeeper for the Myanmar national football team.

He currently plays for Zwegabin United in Myanmar National League.

References

1985 births
Living people
Burmese footballers
Myanmar international footballers
Association football goalkeepers